Bischoffsheim is a commune in the Bas-Rhin department in Grand Est in northeastern France.

Neighboring communes
Bœrsch
Griesheim-près-Molsheim
Rosheim
Krautergersheim
Obernai
Innenheim
Blaesheim

History
Archaeological discoveries attest to the presence of people in the site of Bischoffsheim since the Neolithic, five to six thousand years BCE. Various remains indicate that the site was already important before the Roman period.

Population

See also
Communes of the Bas-Rhin department

References

External links

 Official site

Communes of Bas-Rhin
Bas-Rhin communes articles needing translation from French Wikipedia